Armed & Delirious (released in Israel as GrannyX, in Germany as Granny and in other European countries as Dementia) is a 1997 adventure game for Microsoft Windows. It was written and created by Israelis Benny Davidovich and Makh-Shevet Ltd., and published by Sir-Tech. The player is a delirious grandmother who tries to save her family. Her family, who were cruel to animals, are imprisoned by the Great Rabbit. It has very surreal gameplay and nonsensical puzzles.

Gameplay

Gameplay is performed similarly to most point and click adventure games of its time, featuring clicking and dragging as a mechanic for direction based puzzles.

Inventory items were kept in the presumably infinite space of Granny's Bra, which is the first item the player must retrieve to complete the tutorial zone.

The touted "logically illogical" gameplay resulted in some extremely esoteric puzzle solving, requiring the player to think laterally, or even non sequitorally.

Plot

Armed & Delirious tells a surrealist story about the Crotony family, who torture animals. The family is targeted by the Great Rabbit, one of their escaped captives, who kidnaps them and steals Granny Crotony's cookbook. Granny then seeks to defeat the Great Rabbit, rescue her family and retrieve her cookbook.

Development

Armed & Delirious was developed by Makh-Shevet Development and, in the United States, published by Sir-Tech Software. It features pre-rendered backgrounds, and was shipped on five CD-ROMs. The game was showcased at E3 1997.

Reception

The website Game Revolution rated the game an overall 3.5 out of a possible 5.

While Computer Gaming Worlds Barry Brenesal enjoyed the graphics in Armed & Delirious, he found its characters "despicable", its comedy lacking and its puzzles "obtuse". Colin Williamson concurred in PC Gamer US, praising the graphics and lambasting the puzzles: he argued that the game "looks and plays like it was designed by a malicious Marcel Duchamp." Conversely, Tim Royal of Computer Games Strategy Plus offered the game a positive review. He wrote, "For those folks decrying that the commercialization of gaming has destroyed ingenuity and creativity, this oasis is definitely not a mirage."

See also 
 Piposh, another Israeli video game

References

External links
 

1997 video games
Windows games
Windows-only games
Video games about mental health
Video games about old age
Video games featuring female protagonists
Video games developed in Israel
Sir-Tech games